"Give Me Everything" is a song by American rapper and singer Pitbull featuring  Dutch DJ Afrojack & fellow American singers Ne-Yo and Nayer. Written by the former three and produced by Afrojack, it was released on March 18 2011, through Polo Grounds Music, Mr. 305 Entertainment, and J Records as the second single from Pitbull's sixth studio album, Planet Pit (2011). Rolling Stone described the song as a "club-pop cut with a plaintive Ne-Yo chorus."

In the United States, "Give Me Everything" became the first number-one single on the US Billboard Hot 100 for every artist on the record except Ne-Yo, who had previously reached number-one with his own "So Sick" in 2006. It also became Pitbull's first number one in the United Kingdom as the main artist. The song has also peaked at number one in Belgium, Canada, Ireland, the Netherlands, Romania and within the top-five in twelve countries. It was the seventh best-selling digital single of 2011 with worldwide sales of 8.2 million copies, making it one of the best-selling singles of all time.

Background and composition
Following "Hey Baby (Drop It to the Floor)", "Give Me Everything" is the second single from Pitbull's sixth studio album, Planet Pit, released on June 21, 2011. The song was released on March 18, 2011, through J Records. It was written by Pitbull, Ne-Yo and Afrojack (also producer), the latter two of whom are featured on the song along with Nayer.

Pitbull, Ne-Yo, and Nayer have performed the song at MTV's Spring Break 2011 in Las Vegas. According to Paul Grein of Yahoo! Music, the song combines genres of hip hop, pop, and "Broadway-style theatricality"—exemplified with the repetition of the word "tonight", reminiscent of the song of the same name from the musical West Side Story (1957). Pitbull makes references to photography company Kodak, department store Macy's, and American media personalities Ryan Seacrest and Lindsay Lohan.

According to the sheet music published at musicnotes.com, "Give Me Everything" is written in the key of E♭ major, set in common time and has a tempo of 129 beats per minute. The vocals range from the low note of C3 to the high note of B4.

Pitbull told Daymond John when writing his book Powershift (which he included in the book) that he wrote the song after an encounter with a Princess from Dubai at a club. When the security at the club wanted to chase the Princess away from Pitbull after giving her his number; he was inspired by the events to write that song. John backed this point up even further citing the lyrics "Take advantage of tonight, 'cause I'm off to Dubai to perform for a princess" and Pitbull's own generosity with his fans as the reason he created the song.

Critical reception 
The song has received mixed reviews from music critics. A review from NME magazine criticized Pitbull and the song for having too many random components. The review said "So, how many types of wrong is this? Well, you’ve got your earnest vocal gibbering about living in the moment. You’ve got your cheap rave wibble, a high frequency irritation that buzzes throughout like a fly trapped in jism."

Chart performance
The song debuted at number 60 on the US Billboard Hot 100, on the week of April 16, 2011. In its second week, it climbed to number 17 with 112,000 copies sold: a 259% increase as a result of prominent advertising in the iTunes Store. On the week of June 26, 2011, the song peaked at number one on the chart after having spent four weeks at number two. This became Pitbull, Afrojack and Nayer their first number-one hit in the US and Ne-Yo's first number-one song on this chart since "So Sick" in 2006. As of May 2014, the song has sold 4,874,000 copies in the US. On February 28, 2018, the single was certified six-times platinum by the Recording Industry Association of America (RIAA) for combined sales and streaming equivalent units of over six million units in the United States.

On April 16, 2011, the song debuted on the Canadian Hot 100 at number 46 as the week's highest debut. It climbed to number 26 two weeks later. The song has also debuted in New Zealand at number ten, as well as on the Ultratop charts of both Belgian regions at number 35 in (Flanders) and number 42 in (Wallonia). On the Australian Singles Chart, "Give Me Everything" debuted at number fourteen and climbed to number five the next week. The song has since been certified six-times platinum by the Australian Recording Industry Association. In Austria and France, the song debuted at number 20 and number 39, respectively. In the United Kingdom, "Give Me Everything" debuted at number 35 on the UK Singles Chart on April 24, 2011. The next week it climbed ten places to number 25. Over the next two weeks it progressed from number 12 to number four. On May 22, 2011, it went up three places to number one, knocking "The Lazy Song" by Bruno Mars off the number one position, becoming Pitbull's second, Ne-Yo's fourth, and Afrojack and Nayer's first number one in the United Kingdom. In 2011, the single was the seventh best-selling digital single of year with worldwide sales of 8.2 million copies, making it one of the best-selling singles of all time.

Lawsuit 
On August 22, 2011, Lindsay Lohan filed a lawsuit against Pitbull, Ne-Yo and Afrojack due to the song's lyrics referencing her name. A judge ruled that Pitbull's use of her name was protected by the First Amendment and that Lohan was barely mentioned in the song. As a result, Pitbull won the lawsuit.

Music video
The official music video was directed by David Roulsseau. It was released onto Pitbull's official Vevo channel on May 6, 2011. The video was filmed in the Alexandria Hotel in Los Angeles. It features an appearance by Miss Haiti 2010 Sarodj Bertin, former Girlicious member Natalie Mejia, Cheetah Girls' singer Adrienne Bailon and Russian model Eva Skaya.

"Give Me Everything" is Pitbull's third most viewed music video (as lead artist) after "Rain Over Me" and "Timber". As of December 2022, the video has been viewed over 1 billion times on YouTube.

Track listing

Digital download
"Give Me Everything" (featuring Ne-Yo, Afrojack and Nayer) – 4:16

Digital download — remixes
"Give Me Everything" (Afrojack Remix) (featuring Ne-Yo, Afrojack and Nayer) – 5:40
"Give Me Everything" (Sidney Samson Remix) (featuring Ne-Yo, Afrojack and Nayer) – 6:35
"Give Me Everything" (Apster Remix) (featuring Ne-Yo, Afrojack and Nayer) – 5:50
"Give Me Everything" (Alvaro Remix) (featuring Ne-Yo, Afrojack and Nayer) – 6:01
"Give Me Everything" (R3hab Remix) (featuring Ne-Yo, Afrojack and Nayer) – 5:30
"Give Me Everything" (Adam F Dutch Step Remix) (featuring Ne-Yo, Afrojack and Nayer) – 4:39
"Give Me Everything" (Bingo Players Remix) (featuring Ne-Yo, Afrojack and Nayer) – 4:54
"Give Me Everything" (Jump Smokers Club Mix) (featuring Ne-Yo, Afrojack and Nayer) – 6:06
"Give Me Everything" (Marc Kinchen MK Dub Mix) (featuring Ne-Yo, Afrojack and Nayer) – 5:06

CD single
"Give Me Everything" (Album Version) (featuring Ne-Yo, Afrojack and Nayer) – 4:16
"Give Me Everything" (Afrojack Remix) (featuring Ne-Yo, Afrojack and Nayer) – 5:41

German CD single
"Give Me Everything" (featuring Ne-Yo, Afrojack and Nayer) – 4:16
"Hey Baby (Drop It to the Floor)" (AJ Fire Remix) (featuring T-Pain) – 4:23

German CD maxi single
"Give Me Everything" (featuring Ne-Yo, Afrojack and Nayer) – 4:16
"Give Me Everything" (Afrojack Remix) (featuring Ne-Yo, Afrojack and Nayer) – 5:41
"Give Me Everything" (Jump Smokers Radio Mix) (featuring Ne-Yo, Afrojack and Nayer) – 5:25
"Give Me Everything" (R3hab Remix) (featuring Ne-Yo, Afrojack and Nayer) – 5:31
"Give Me Everything" (Sidney Samson Remix) (featuring Ne-Yo, Afrojack and Nayer) – 6:35

Credits and personnel
Pitbull – vocals, songwriter
Afrojack – songwriter, producer, keyboards, MIDI programming, recording
Ne-Yo – vocals, songwriter
Nayer – background vocals, songwriter
Mike "TrakGuru" Johnson – Ne-Yo vocal recording
Manny Marroquin – mixing
Erik Madrid – mixing assistant
Chris Galland – mixing assistant
Darius Brown – mixing supervisor

Source:

Charts

Weekly charts

Year-end charts

Decade-end charts

All-time charts

Certifications

Release history

See also
 List of best-selling singles in Australia
Billboard Top Latin Songs Year-End Chart
List of Dutch Top 40 number-one singles of 2011
List of Hot 100 number-one singles of 2011 (U.S.)
List of number-one Billboard Top Latin Songs of 2011
List of Ultratop 50 number-one singles of 2011
List of Ultratop 40 number-one singles of 2011

References

External links
 
 

2011 singles
2011 songs
Pitbull (rapper) songs
Ne-Yo songs
Afrojack songs
Songs written by Ne-Yo
UK Singles Chart number-one singles
Number-one singles in Hungary
Number-one singles in Romania
Number-one singles in Russia
Number-one singles in Scotland
Irish Singles Chart number-one singles
Dutch Top 40 number-one singles
Ultratop 50 Singles (Flanders) number-one singles
Ultratop 50 Singles (Wallonia) number-one singles
Canadian Hot 100 number-one singles
Billboard Hot 100 number-one singles
Monitor Latino Top Inglés number-one singles
Songs written by Afrojack
Hip house songs
Electropop songs
Dance-pop songs
J Records singles